The 6th Libau Infantry Regiment was an infantry regiment of the Imperial Russian Army. It was formed on May 16, 1806 during the reign of Tsar Alexander I of Russia and disbanded in 1918. The regiment took part in warfare during the Napoleonic era, as well as World War I.

History 
The regiment celebrated its anniversary on June 8. The regiment was named after its patrons, various Prussian princes from 1822. The last of its patrons was Prince Friedrich Leopold of Prussia, who was its patron from 1885. In 1914, its garrison was the Novogeorgievsk Fortress and it was part of the 1st Brigade of the 2nd Infantry Division (Russian Empire).  On 1 August 1914, the regiment dropped its patron's name from its title as a result of the outbreak of World War I against Germany.

References

Bibliography

External links
 Spis pułków armii carskiej (pl)
 http://www.grwar.ru/regiments/regiments.html?id=760 (ru)

Infantry regiments of the Russian Empire
Warsaw Governorate
Military units and formations established in 1806
Military units and formations disestablished in 1918